The International Phonetic Association (IPA; French: , API) is an organization that promotes the scientific study of phonetics and the various practical applications of that science. The IPA's major contribution to phonetics is the International Phonetic Alphabet—a notational standard for the phonetic representation of all languages. The acronym IPA refers to both the association and the alphabet. On 30 June 2015, it was incorporated as a British private company limited by guarantee.

The IPA also publishes the Journal of the International Phonetic Association. In addition, it arranges for the quadrennial International Congress of Phonetic Sciences (ICPhS) through its affiliate, the Permanent Council for the Organization of ICPhS.

Early history 

In 1886, a small group of language teachers in Paris formed an association to encourage the use of phonetic notation in schools to help children acquire realistic pronunciations of foreign languages and also to aid in teaching reading to young children. The group, led by Paul Passy, called itself initially Dhi Fonètik Tîtcerz' Asóciécon (the FTA). In January 1889, the name of the Association was changed to L'Association Phonétique des Professeurs de Langues Vivantes (AP), and, in 1897, to L'Association Phonétique Internationale (API)—in English, the International Phonetic Association (IPA). The IPA's early peak of membership and influence in education circles was around 1914, when there were 1751 members in 40 countries. World War I and its aftermath severely disrupted the Association's activities, and the Journal did not resume regular publication until 1922.

Development of the Alphabet 

The group's initial aim was to create a set of phonetic symbols to which different articulations could apply, such that each language would have an alphabet particularly suited to describe the sounds of the language. Eventually it was decided that a universal alphabet, with the same symbol being used for the same sound in different languages was the ideal. Since then, there have been several sets of changes to the Alphabet, with additions and deletions that the progress of the science of phonetics has indicated.

Examinations 

The IPA also has given examinations in phonetics since 1908, awarding Certificates of Proficiency in the phonetics of English, French, or German.

See also 
 List of phonetics topics
 Language reform

References

Further reading
 International Phonetic Association. (1999). Handbook of the International Phonetic Association: A guide to the use of the International Phonetic Alphabet. Cambridge: Cambridge University Press.

External links 
  International Phonetic Association

International Phonetic Alphabet
International learned societies
International organisations based in London
Organizations established in 1886
1886 establishments in France